HMS Undaunted was one of seven  armoured cruisers built for the Royal Navy in the mid-1880s.

Design and description
During her sea trials, Undaunted reached . The ship's complement was 484 officers and ratings.

Undaunteds main armament consisted of two breech-loading (BL)  Mk V guns, one gun fore and aft of the superstructure on pivot mounts. Her secondary armament was ten BL  guns, five on each broadside. Protection against torpedo boats was provided by six quick-firing (QF) 6-pounder Hotchkiss guns and ten QF 3-pounder Hotchkiss guns, most of which were mounted on the main deck in broadside positions. The ship was also armed with six 18-inch (457 mm) torpedo tubes: four on the broadside above water and one each in the bow and stern below water.

The ends of the armour belt were closed off by transverse bulkheads .

Construction and service
Undaunted was laid down on 23 April 1885 by Palmers at their shipyard in Jarrow. The ship was launched on 25 November 1886, and completed on 18 September 1890. It was under the command of Captain Charles Bereford, his first command. She served with the Mediterranean fleet under overall command of Sir George Tryon.

On 21 March 1893, Undaunted, under the command of the then Rear Admiral Charles Beresford struck rocks on leaving Alexandria harbour, owing to an error by the ship's navigation officer, who gave the order to turn to Port instead of Starboard. The ship received minor underwater damage in the impact.

She served two commissions on the China Station. On 25 April 1901, she was paid off at Devonport and placed in the Fleet Reserve, where she stayed for a year, until she was prepared to be commissioned as tender to HMS Cambridge, gunnery school ship at the dockyard. Captain Frederick Alexander Warden was appointed in command on her commission as tender on 26 August 1902. She was sold for scrapping on 9 April 1907 to Harris of Bristol.

Notes

References
 
 
 

 

Orlando-class cruisers
Ships built on the River Tyne
1886 ships